Romy: Anatomy of a Face is a 1967 West German documentary film directed by Hans-Jürgen Syberberg, about the actress Romy Schneider. The film was shot at the ski resort of Kitzbühel during three days in February 1966. It was made for television.

The film director Syberberg portrays the aspiring film actress Romy Schneider while skiing on the Kitzbüheler Horn, walking around Kaps Castle and talking about her career in detail by the fireplace: Romy Schneider expresses her great desire to play theater in Germany and Austria, but at the same time confesses her stage fright. She talks about the beginning of her career with her first film role in 1953 at the side of her mother Magda Schneider, as well as about the great success of the "Sissi films". She talks about her everyday life when she was not filming in Paris, the “star system” in the USA and the shooting of the film The Trial (1962) with director Orson Welles as well as about her encounter with Coco Chanel in 1962.

Syberberg shows an amazingly open Romy Schneider, with all the magic of her 27-year-old physical beauty, the softly modulated voice, but at the same time you can also see her great sensitivity, her nervousness and the actress's self-doubts. The viewer gets a deep insight into Romy Schneider's character, the portrait radiates a great direct closeness. The film is underlaid with music from the 1960s (Oscar Peterson's “Tangerine”, the chanson “Que c'est triste Venise” by Charles Aznavour and the song “Bee-Bom” by Sammy Davis Jr.) and vividly conveys the leisure life of Romy Schneider.

References

External links 
 

1967 documentary films
1967 films
1967 television films
German documentary television films
West German films
1960s German-language films
German-language television shows
Documentary films about actors
Films directed by Hans-Jürgen Syberberg
Films produced by Rob Houwer
Films shot in Austria
Documentary films about women in film
Black-and-white documentary films
1960s German films
Romy Schneider